Savitaben Khant (c. 1960 – 21 December 2012, Vadodara) was an Indian politician. Khant was a resident of Viramiya village. She won the Morva-Hadaf (ST) seat in the 2012 Gujarat Legislative Assembly election, as an Indian National Congress candidate. This was her first time to contest elections. However, she died at a private hospital in Vadodara just one day after the election result was declared.

References

2012 deaths
Indian National Congress politicians from Gujarat
People from Vadodara
Women in Gujarat politics
Gujarati people
Gujarat MLAs 2012–2017
21st-century Indian women politicians
21st-century Indian politicians
Year of birth uncertain